Hodaka may refer to:

 Hodaka (motorcycle), a joint Japanese and American company
 Hodaka Maruyama (born 1984), Japanese politician
 Hodaka Yoshida (1926–1995), Japanese artist

See also
 Hotaka (disambiguation)

Japanese masculine given names